Mansar Lake is a lake located  from the city of Jammu in Jammu and Kashmir, India. It is fringed by forest-covered hills, and is over a mile in length and half-a-mile in width. Surinsar-Mansar Lakes are designated as Ramsar Convention in November 2005. Mansar is primarily fed by surface run-off and partially by mineralised water through paddy fields. The lake supports CITES and IUCN redlisted Lissemys punctuata, Aspideretes gangeticus and Mansariella lacustris. The composite lake is high in micro nutrients for which it is an attractive habitat, breeding and nursery ground for migratory waterfolks like Fulica atra, Gallinula chloropus, Podiceps nigricollis, Aythya fuligula and various Anas species.

About
Besides being a popular excursion destination in Jammu, it is also a holy site, sharing the legend and sanctity of Lake Manasarovar. On the Eastern Bank of the Lake there is a shrine to Sheshnag (a snake with six heads). The shrine comprises a big boulder on which are placed a number of iron chains perhaps representing the small serpents waiting on the tutelary deity of the Sheshnag. Two ancient temples of Umapati Mahadev & Narsimha as also a temple of Durga are situated in the vicinity of the Mansar lake. People take a holy dip in the water of the lake on festive occasions.

Newlyweds consider it auspicious to perform three circum-ambulations (Parikarma) around the lake to seek the blessings of Sheshnag, the lord of serpents, whose shrine is located on its eastern bank.

Certain communities of Hindus perform the Mundan ceremony (First hair cut) of their male children here.

There are also some ancient temples on the lake's shores, which are visited by devotees in large numbers. Mansar is also ideal for boating for which the Tourism Department provides adequate facilities.

This Mansar lake road joins to another important road that directly links Pathankot (Punjab) to Udhampur (Jammu & Kashmir, Jammu Province. Udhampur is a Town of strategic importance, again on National Highway No. 1A. The shortcut road from Mansar or Samba to Udhampur by-passes the Jammu town.

Flora and fauna
Areas around Mansar lake are rich in forests. Many types of trees such as Scrub, Peepal and Acacia are found here. The lake is bordered with Pine trees and provides shelter to a number of Birds and Animals. There is also a wildlife sentury near the lake which provides home to a number of Birds and Animals such as Spotted Deer, Nilgai, Cranes and Ducks. Many types of Fishes and Tortoises are also found in the Lake. Some types of Snakes are also found in the lake.

History
History of Mansar is of the time of Mahabharata. Babar Vahan (son of Arjuna and Ulpi) was the ruler of this area during that time. After the war, Arjuna performed a ritual called "Ashwamegh Yagya" to prove his mettle and vantage over the land. Babar Vahan captured the horse which was the power symbol of the yagya at Khoon village near Dhar Udhampur road where later on Babar Vahan killed arjuna. After the victory, Babar Vahan shared his success with his mother by presenting the head of Arjuna to her. After knowing that Arjuna was the father of Babar, he wanted to get Arjuna back. Therefore, he had to procure Mani from sheshnag. For that, Babar Vahan made a tunnel with his arrow which was known as Surangsar. After defecting sheshnag and capturing the mani, he came out of Manisar(Mansar), that was the other end of the tunnel.

Gallery

References

Lakes of Jammu and Kashmir
Jammu Division
Ramsar sites in India

ru:Мансар (озеро)